Phillip D. Brady (born May 20, 1951, in Pasadena, CA) was Assistant to the President and Staff Secretary in the White House from 1991 to 1993 under President George H. W. Bush, as well as General Counsel to the US Department of Transportation. He was formerly the President of the National Automobile Dealers Association.

Early life 
Brady, a cum laude graduate of both the University of Notre Dame in Indiana and Loyola University School of Law in New Orleans, practiced law in California before entering politics in Washington, D.C.

References 

|-

1951 births
Living people
United States Department of Transportation officials
University of Notre Dame alumni
White House Staff Secretaries